Look What I Did is an American band, formed in 2001 in Nashville, Tennessee. The band is known for its intense live show, described by Cincinnati CityBeat as a "live act capable of unleashing a scary, uncontrolled intensity bordering on dangerous", and oft-satirical eccentric lyrics.

History
In 2003, the band added a second guitar player, Aaron "Skeet" Childress, formerly of National Green, and moved to Los Angeles. At this time it also released it first recording, an independently recorded, financed and released LP, My First Time, on its own Clockrock Recordings. Despite its limited pressing, the record was reported in ezines such as theprp.com, Loudside, and Opuszine.  

In early 2008, the band signed a deal with the new label Modernist Movement. Atlas Drugged was released on February 9, 2010, by Modernist Movement Recordings. Atlas Drugged was produced by Brian Virtue. Decibel magazine referred to the band in a review of Atlas Drugged, "Look What I Did crush on political philosophers, put Latin words in their song titles and generally get off on being a bunch of wiseasses to spazzed-out Adderall punk."

Zanzibar III: Analog Prison was named the Best Metal Album of 2015 by The Nashville Scene.

The band released a full new song "If I Were You I Wouldn't" in January 2016 on its YouTube account, followed by "Fireball" in June 2016, the first songs released since Zanzibar III : Analog Prison.

The band was named after friend's child said the phrase, "Mommy, look what I did," to her mother about a drawing when Donegan was talking to her over the phone discussing what the band's name should be.

In September 2020, the band announced that Evan Brewer had joined on bass guitar, replacing Chad Omen, with new music underway in the studio.

Discography

Studio albums
2003: My First Time (Clockrock Recordings)
2005: Minuteman for the Moment (Combat Records)
2010: Atlas Drugged (Modernist Movement Recordings)
2014: Zanzibar III: Analog Prison (So Say We All Records)
2019: Sympathy Porn (So Say We All Records)

Videography
"Minuteman for the Moment" (2005)
"Fade to Daft" (2010)
"I'm Majoring in Psychology" (2010)
"Serf Song" (2010)
"Pussy Comitatus" (2011)
"Sebastian's Analog Prison" (2013)
"Wait, Don't Jump" (2015)
"If I Were You I Wouldn't" (2016)
"Hands Off My Snacks" (2019)

References

External links
Look What I Did official website
Music on Reverbnation 
Look What I Did on Spotify
[ Look What I Did on Allmusic]

MNRK Music Group artists
Musical groups established in 2001